Karym (Karım) is a rural locality (a settlement) in Ust-Muninskoye Rural Settlement of Mayminsky District, the Altai Republic, Russia. The population was 81 as of 2016. There are 2 streets.

Geography 
Karym is located 53 km south of Mayma (the district's administrative centre) by road. Ust-Muny is the nearest rural locality.

References 

Rural localities in Mayminsky District